Theodore Conover (March 10, 1868 – July 27, 1910), nicknamed "Huck" was a Major League Baseball player who pitched in one game for the Cincinnati Red Stockings of the American Association on May 26, 1889. He pitched two innings in the game, allowing four runs, three of which were earned. He continued to play in the minor leagues through 1897.

External links

1868 births
1910 deaths
Major League Baseball pitchers
19th-century baseball players
Cincinnati Red Stockings (AA) players
Austin Senators players
Akron Akrons players
Spokane Bunchgrassers players
Macon Central City players
Macon Hornets players
Atlanta Atlantas players
Canton Deubers players
Columbus Statesmen players
Dallas Navigators players
Nashville Centennials players
Henderson (minor league baseball) players
Baseball players from Kentucky